White Whales (orig: Skytturnar) the third film directed by Icelandic director Friðrik Þór Friðriksson in 1987. Starring Eggert Guðmundsson, Þórarinn Óskar Þórarinsson, and Eggert Þorleifsson, this film features Hilmar Örn Hilmarsson, Sykurmolarnir, Bubbi Morthens, and MX-21 on the soundtrack. The film was selected as the Icelandic entry for the Best Foreign Language Film at the 60th Academy Awards, but was not accepted as a nominee.

Cast
Eggert Guðmundsson
Þórarinn Óskar Þórarinsson
Harald G. Harladsson
Karl Guðmundsson
Auður Jónsdóttir
Eggert Þorleifsson
Helgi Björnsson
Guðbjörg Thoroddsen
Björn Karlsson
Hrönn Steingrímsdóttir
Þorsteinn Hannesson
Baldvin Halldórsson
Valdimar Flygenring
Briet Héðinsdóttir

Plot

The story starts when two experienced whalers decided to settle down in Reykjavík at the end of the whaling season. While there, they get into trouble and are thrown out of one establishment after another. When events escalated to violence, they break into a weapons shop and steal rifles to confront the police.

Credits
Director: Friðrik Þór Friðriksson.
Producer: Petter J. Borgli and Friðrik Þór Friðriksson.
Writers: Friðrik Þór Friðriksson and Einar Kárason.
Cinematography: Ari Kristinsson.
Edition: Tómas Gíslason and Jens Bidstrup.
Music performers: Hilmar Örn Hilmarsson, Sykurmolarnir, Bubbi Morthens & MX-21.
Sound recording: Þorbjörn Erlingsson and Þorvar Hafsteinsson.
Coincidental music: “Doubt”, “Atmosphere Pt. 1”, “Atmosphere Pt. 2”, “Tension Pt. 1”, “Tension Pt. 2”, “Tension Pt. 3”, “Sorrow”. Other tracks: “Batman Theme”, “Car Rock”, “Sweet Jane”, “99th Floor” and “Synist”.
Note: all track names given in English.

See also
1987 Skytturnar (Gramm), the soundtrack.
 List of submissions to the 60th Academy Awards for Best Foreign Language Film
 List of Icelandic submissions for the Academy Award for Best Foreign Language Film

References

External links

 

1987 films
1987 drama films
1980s Icelandic-language films
Films directed by Friðrik Þór Friðriksson
Films scored by Hilmar Örn Hilmarsson
Icelandic drama films